Richard Stanley Thorp (2 January 1932 – 22 May 2013) was an English actor. He was best known for his 30-year tenure portraying Alan Turner in the ITV soap opera Emmerdale from 1982 to 2013. He also appeared in films such as The Dam Busters (1955) and The Barretts of Wimpole Street (1957).

Early life
Thorp was born in Purley, Surrey. Whilst showing early ambitions to act he started working in the shoe business, Lilley & Skinner, where his father was one of several directors. There he began writing advertising copy including the line "Men's shoes that men choose" whilst continuing to pursue amateur dramatics. However, it was his frequent bad time keeping that caused him to be sacked by his father enabling him to pursue his ambition and train at the Guildhall School of Music and Drama.

Career
Thorp's leading television roles included Dr. John Rennie in Emergency – Ward 10 from 1957 to 1961, and Doug Randall in Crossroads in 1975. He also appeared in a 1982 episode of Strangers. He was the longest-serving member of Emmerdale since the death of Clive Hornby in 2008. While he was happy to stay in the role of Alan Turner for so long, he complained that his character was not used as much any more.

Thorp appeared as Lovejoy, a British Railways official, in an episode of To the Manor Born centred on the proposed closure of the local railway station. He also appeared on Lily Savage's Blankety Blank.

Personal life
Thorp was one of Emmerdale most private actors, although he gave an interview in 1995 with The People and revealed that he was separated from his wife, but they still lived in the same house together. Thorp was very good friends with Lorraine Chase, who played his on-screen daughter, Steph Stokes in Emmerdale, and Sheree Murphy, who played his on-screen granddaughter, Tricia Stokes in Emmerdale.

Thorp took a break from Emmerdale in July 2009 after undergoing a knee operation and returned in April 2010.

Death
Thorp died in Shrewsbury on 22 May 2013. Emmerdale producer Kate Oates stated: "Richard's death is a sad loss to Emmerdale, of which he was at the heart for so many wonderful years. Richard had a brilliant sense of humour and he will be missed by every single member of our production whose lives he touched."

Filmography

Film

References

External links
 

1932 births
2013 deaths
Male actors from Surrey
English male soap opera actors
English male film actors
People educated at Uppingham School
Alumni of the Guildhall School of Music and Drama
People from Purley, London